Nunawading Province was an electorate of the Victorian Legislative Council. 
It was created in 1976, based in the outer eastern Melbourne suburbs including Nunawading. It was finally abolished 29 March 1996. Much of its area was replaced by Koonung Province.

In the 1985 election, the result for this province was subject to much controversy when the vote ended with a complete dead heat after preferences. Both the Labor candidate Bob Ives and the Liberal candidate Rosemary Varty received 54,821 votes each. The returning officer, Kathleen Leonard, was required by law to make a casting vote, which she did so by drawing a name from a ballot box. The name drawn was Bob Ives and he was declared elected.

This result did not stand, and a by-election was called, in which the Liberal candidate Varty won with a swing to her.

Members for Nunawading Province

Election results

References

Former electoral provinces of Victoria (Australia)
1976 establishments in Australia
1996 disestablishments in Australia